Falkia is a genus of flowering plants in the family Convolvulaceae, native to southern Africa, eastern Africa, and the Arabian Peninsula. They are creeping perennial herbs.

Species
Currently accepted species include:

Falkia canescens C.H.Wright
Falkia oblonga Bernh.
Falkia repens Thunb.

References

Convolvulaceae
Convolvulaceae genera